WXRA (99.3 FM) is a radio station licensed to Inglis, Florida, United States and airing a Christian Worship format programmed by EMF's Air 1. The station is currently owned by George S. Flinn, Jr.

References

External links

Air1 radio stations
Radio stations established in 2008
2008 establishments in Florida
XRA